The Meigs County Courthouse in Decatur, Tennessee was built in 1903.  It was listed on the National Register of Historic Places in 1978.

It is a two-story building on a brick foundation.

References

External links

County courthouses in Tennessee
National Register of Historic Places in Meigs County, Tennessee
Government buildings completed in 1903